Mapp Biopharmaceutical is an American pharmaceutical company founded in 2003 by Larry Zeitlin and Kevin Whaley. Mapp Biopharmaceutical is based in San Diego, California. It is responsible for the research and development of  ZMapp, a drug which is still under development and comprises three humanized monoclonal antibodies used as a treatment for Ebola virus disease. The drug was first tested in humans during the 2014 West Africa Ebola virus outbreak.

The ZMapp drug is a result of the collaboration between Mapp Biopharmaceutical, LeafBio (the commercial arm of Mapp Biopharmaceutical), Defyrus Inc. (Toronto), the U.S. government, and the Public Health Agency of Canada.  The antibody work came out of research projects funded by Defense Advanced Research Projects Agency (DARPA) more than a decade ago, and years of funding by the Public Health Agency of Canada.  ZMapp is manufactured in the tobacco plant Nicotiana benthamiana in the bioproduction process known as "pharming" by Kentucky BioProcessing, a subsidiary of Reynolds American.

References

External links
Website of Mapp Biopharmaceutical
Longtime vision leads to Ebola serum (Interview with Larry Zeitlin, August 6, 2014)

Companies based in San Diego
Health care companies based in California
Pharmaceutical companies of the United States